Codeta may refer to:

 Cape Organisation for the Democratic Taxi Association (also known as Congress of Democratic Taxi Association), a South African taxi mother body
 Gelotia, a genus of jumping spider